Jul i Skomakergata is a Norwegian TV-show for children, produced in 1979. It is a televised advent calendar, meaning it is broadcast from December 1 to December 24. It has been broadcast several times in Norway by NRK. The story revolves around shoe repairer Jens Petrus Andersen, played by Henki Kolstad, and his shop. He is visited by friends and townspeople who need their shoes repaired before Christmas, and has a pet named Tøflus (a puppet). A part of the show consists of showing a clip from Sandmännchen (Jon Blund in Norwegian) which tells children about the United Nations' Convention on the Rights of the Child.

In 2006, the Norwegian comedian Zahid Ali created an advent calendar show called Jul i Tøyengata, a parody of Jul i Skomakergata which shows a multicultural street in Oslo and deals with problems such as racism and cultural clashes.

See also 
 Verdens Gang

References 

Christmas television specials
Norwegian children's television series
NRK original programming
Norwegian television shows featuring puppetry
Christmas television series